Bobbi Jo Hjertaas (née Steadward; born May 13, 1976) is a former field hockey defender from Canada. Born in Edmonton, Alberta, Canada, she earned a total number of 49 international caps for the Canadian National Team during her career.
She won a bronze medal, at the 1999 Pan American Games.

International Senior Tournaments
 1998 – Commonwealth Games, Kuala Lumpur, Malaysia (not ranked)
 1999 – Pan American Games, Winnipeg, Manitoba, Canada (3rd)

References

External links
 Profile on Field Hockey Canada

1976 births
Canadian female field hockey players
Living people
Sportspeople from Edmonton
Field hockey players at the 1998 Commonwealth Games
Commonwealth Games competitors for Canada